K-106 is an approximately  state highway in the U.S. state of Kansas. It is signed as a west–east route even though the first approximately  runs directly south to north. K-106's western terminus is at K-18 north-northwest of Salina, and the eastern terminus is a continuation as Lake Drive at Ottawa State Fishing Lake. About midway along the route, K-106 serves the city of Minneapolis and intersects U.S. Route 81 (US-81) just west of the city. South of Minneapolis, the highway passes within  of Rock City, a group of 200 spherical boulders designated as a National Natural Landmark.

K-106 was first established on July 8, 1944, as a spur from US-81 to Minneapolis. In a resolution on May 25, 1949, a road was extended from the north side of the city to US-81 and became known as K-106N and the original K-106 became K-106S. Then by 1956, K-106S and K-106N became K-106, a complete loop through the city. On July 11, 1956, K-106 was extended southward from Minneapolis to K-18, and the loop within Minneapolis was eliminated. K-106 was extended east on June 14, 1994, over K-93 to Ottawa State Fishing Lake when a new alignment of US-81 was built.

Route description
K-106's western terminus is at an intersection with K-18 north-northwest of Salina. The highway begins travelling north through small rolling hills covered with a mix of farmlands and grasslands. Roughly  later the highway crosses Battle Creek, a tributary of the Solomon River. It advances north to an intersection with Ivy Road, which connects to Rock City, a group of 200 spherical boulders designated as a National Natural Landmarks. Here the landscape surrounding K-106 levels out and transitions to farmlands, as it continues north past an airport. As it passes by the airport it crosses Salt Creek then curves east. It continues east for  then curves northeast and enters the city of Minneapolis. As the roadway enters the city it crosses the Solomon River then has an at-grade crossing with a Union Pacific Railroad track. K-106 then turns east at and begins to follow 1st Street. The highway then turns south at Rothsay Avenue and leaves 1st Street. It soon turns east and begins to follow Laurel Street and passes Highland Cemetery as it exits the city. K-106 continues east and crosses Lindsey Creek before reaching a diamond interchange with US-81. The highway then turns southeast and begins to parallel US-81. It passes through flat rural farmlands before intersecting North 180th Road. The highway continues for  then curves north and reaches its eastern terminus  later at Ottawa State Fishing Lake, where it continues as Lake Drive.

The Kansas Department of Transportation (KDOT) tracks the traffic levels on its highways, and in 2018, they determined that on average the traffic varied from 190 vehicles per day at the eastern terminus to 1,850 vehicles per day just west of the junction with US-81. K-106 is not included in the National Highway System, but does connect to it at its junction with US-81. All but  of K-106's alignment is maintained by KDOT. The entire section within Minneapolis is maintained by the city.

History
Before state highways were numbered in Kansas there were auto trails, which were an informal network of marked routes that existed in the United States and Canada in the early part of the 20th century. The former Blue Line, which ran from Limon, Colorado to Junction City, follows K-106's southern terminus. In Minneaopolis, the highway crosses a spur of the former Sunflower Trail, which ran from Salina north to Beloit, and the former Meridian Highway, which ran from Laredo, Texas north to Pembina, North Dakota. In Minneapolis, US-81 originally followed East 10th Street then turned north onto North 120th Road.

K-106 was assigned by KDOT, at the time State Highway Commission of Kansas (SHC), on July 8, 1944, when US-81 was moved slightly east to a new alignment. At that time it began at the Minneapolis city limits and ran east along Laurel Street to US-81. In a May 25, 1949 resolution, a road was extended from the north side of the city east along 10th Street to US-81 and became known as K-106N and the original K-106 became K-106S. Between 1953 and 1956, K-106S and K-106N became K-106, a complete loop through the city. On July 11, 1956, the SHC passed a resolution to extend K-106 southward  to K-18, and the section along Laurel Street formally known as K-106N was eliminated. The bridge over the Solomon River, just south of Minneapolis, was closed for three weeks between September and October 1962. The original brick, concrete and blacktop deck was ripped up and replaced with a concrete deck.

In June 1990, Secretary of Transportation Horace Edwards announced that between 1991 and 1995, that US-81 would be expanded to four lanes from Minneapolis north to Concordia. This project included building an interchange at the junction with K-106. On May 19, 1995, a groundbreaking ceremony for the section of US-81 from Minneapolis north  was held at the junction with K-106. This section of US-81 was completed in 1997. The portion of K-106 from Heartland Drive east to Ottawa Lake was designated as K-93 on May 1, 1936. By June 1994, the realignment of US-81 was nearing completion. In a resolution on June 14, 1994, K-106 was extended south along the former US-81 then east along K-93, at which time the K-93 designation was removed.

Major intersections

Notes

References

External links

Kansas Department of Transportation State Map
KDOT: Historic State Maps

106
Transportation in Ottawa County, Kansas